Ángel Corsino Fernández (born 16 February 1951) is a Spanish sports shooter. He competed in the men's 50 metre free pistol event at the 1984 Summer Olympics.

References

1951 births
Living people
Spanish male sport shooters
Olympic shooters of Spain
Shooters at the 1984 Summer Olympics
Place of birth missing (living people)
20th-century Spanish people